Sydney Matthews (born 22 January 1952) is a Guyanese cricketer. He played in 41 first-class and 6 List A matches for Guyana from 1969 to 1988.

See also
 List of Guyanese representative cricketers

References

External links
 

1952 births
Living people
Guyanese cricketers
Guyana cricketers